St Andrew's and St George's West Church serves Edinburgh's New Town, in Scotland. It is a congregation of the Church of Scotland. The parish today constitutes the whole of the First New Town of Edinburgh and a small part of the early-19th-century Second New Town of Edinburgh. The church building was completed in 1784, and is now protected as a category A listed building.

Buildings
Two churches, St Andrew's and St George's, were planned as principal elements in the New Town of Edinburgh. James Craig's plan of 1767 for the First New Town laid out a grid pattern of streets reflecting classical order and rationalism. It was the age of the Scottish Enlightenment, and Edinburgh was becoming internationally renowned as the centre of new philosophy and thought. The two churches were intended to be built on Charlotte Square (originally to be named St George Square), at the west end of George Street, and St Andrew Square at the east end. However, Sir Lawrence Dundas, a wealthy businessman, preferred the eastern site for his home and bought the ground before Craig's plan could be implemented. St Andrew's Church had to be built part-way along George Street, and its place was taken by Dundas House, designed by Sir William Chambers.

St Andrew's Church

The Town Council held a competition for a design for the eastern church, St Andrew's, which was won by Captain Andrew Frazer of the Royal Engineers and Robert Kay. The church was founded in 1781 and opened in 1784. The church is notable for its elliptical plan which was the first in Britain. The site on the north side of George Street was already developed when the Town Council bought it back to establish the Church, and this shallow space suited the elliptical design. There are similarities to William Adam's design for Hamilton Old Parish Church and to James Gibbs' original idea for St Martin-in-the-Fields in London, both of which were circular sanctuaries fronted with porticoes. The architectural style reflects the contemporary 18th-century fashion for classical Roman forms. These include the temple-front portico with ceiling rosettes based on examples found in Syria by Robert Wood and illustrated in his Ruins of Palmyra of 1753. The magnificent interior-ceiling design, in the style of Robert Adam, also incorporates many features found in Roman and Pompeian interior design, as well as Scottish thistles. The pulpit stands on the north wall, with a panelled gallery with original box pews round the other sides of the ellipse. The pulpit was lowered and the sounding board removed during a 1953 refurbishment, with sections of 19th century box pews removed during 2012 refurbishments.

The original design for St Andrew's Church included a short tower but the Town Council opted for a 51m steeple, built in 1787. It contains a unique peal of eight bells cast in 1788 by William and Thomas Mears at the Whitechapel Bell Foundry, the oldest complete ring in Scotland. The bells were refurbished in 2006 and restored to full change ringing. The original Georgian crown glass sash windows with glazing bars no longer exist. Of the replacements the most noteworthy are stained glass windows depicting The Beatitudes by Alfred Webster (1913) and The Son of Man by Douglas Strachan (1934).

In 1976 the cellar space under the church was adapted for use as the "Undercroft", later linked by a stair to the vestibule.

In 1947 St Andrew's Church was united with Queen Street Church of Scotland, with the Queen Street church building used as church halls. Queen Street Church had been formed by the union in 1891 of Tollbooth Free Church and St Luke's Free Church to form Queen Street Free Church, which became Queen Street United Free Church in 1900 (at the union of the Free Church and the United Presbyterians) and then Queen Street Church after the 1929 union of the United Free Church and Church of Scotland.

St George's Church

St George's Church, on the west side of Charlotte Square, was begun in 1811, with Robert Reid adapting Adam's design from 1791. The original estimate of £18,000 rose to over £23,600 by the time the church was opened in 1814. Severe structural defects, caused by the use of wood and stone underneath the dome, led to its closure in the 1960s when it was taken over by the Ministry of Public Building and Works and converted for use as archives (now part of the National Records of Scotland).

St George's West Church

Free St George's Church was built in 1866–69 to designs by David Bryce in Roman Baroque style. The tower in the south-west corner is partly by Bryce, but was completed by Robert Rowand Anderson, who had briefly been in partnership with Bryce, in 1879–81 with a 56m Venetian campanile, modeled on that of San Giorgio Maggiore.

In 1900 the church was one of the several which partly amalgamated with the United Presbyterian Church of Scotland to create the United Free Church of Scotland. It continued to be called St George's Free Church. In 1929 the United Free Church merged with the Church of Scotland with relatively few staying in the continuing church. The church was thereafter simply called St George's West and was operated by the Church of Scotland.

History

St Andrew's Church was the setting for the Disruption of 1843, one of the most significant events in 19th-century Scotland. Fuelled by increasing concern and resentment about the Civil Courts' infringements on the liberties of the Church of Scotland, around one third of the ministers present at the annual church's General Assembly walked out, cheered by onlookers outside, and constituted the Free Church of Scotland.

In 1964, the congregation of St George's Church in Charlotte Square was united with St Andrew's, forming St Andrew's and St George's. The St George's Church building is now used by the National Records of Scotland. Today, the church hosts an annual book sale for Christian Aid. First held in 1974, in 2006 this event raised over £113,000, including the proceeds of the sale of the script of the Doctor Who episode "New Earth", signed by David Tennant and Billie Piper.

In January 2010, the congregation of St Andrew's and St George's was united with St George's West, Shandwick Place, to form the congregation of St Andrew's and St George's West. Both buildings were in use for three years, with the former St Andrew's and St George's building as the principal place of worship until renovation work started in 2012.

On 17 February 2013, St George's West church held its final Church of Scotland service; a special piece of choral music (which was dedicated to the choir of St Andrew's and St George's West Parish church) was written by Stuart Mitchell for the occasion. The congregation moved back to the church on George Street, and the Shandwick Place building was handed over to Charlotte Chapel, an independent Baptist church on the nearby Rose Street which had outgrown its building and purchased the church for £1.55 million. Charlotte Chapel don't expect to move in until 2016 while £750,000 worth of renovation work occurs, most prominently the re-siting of the centrally-located organ console to make way for a baptismal tank. This will be the console's third position since its installation in 1897, and the church's third denomination (originally opened as a Free Church in 1869). The final hymn played on the Hollins organ was 'Lord, for the years your love has kept and guided'.

Ministry
The Reverend Dr Rosie Magee was inducted by the Presbytery of Edinburgh as the new minister on 29 May 2019.

A former minister of St Andrew's and St George's was the Very Rev Dr Andrew McLellan, who was elected Moderator of the General Assembly of the Church of Scotland in 2000 and served as H. M. Chief Inspector of Prisons for Scotland until his retirement in 2009.

The two most recent ministers of the former St George's West Church were the Rev Peter J. Macdonald (1998–2008), who went on to become the leader of the Iona Community, and the Rev Robert L. Glover (1985–1997), who became minister at Chalmers Memorial Church in Cockenzie and Port Seton, East Lothian.

Ministers of St Andrew's Church

1784 William Greenfield
1787 William Moodie
1801 David Ritchie (second charge)
1813 Andrew Grant
1837 John Bruce
1843 Thomas Clark
1844 Thomas Jackson Crawford (second charge)
1857 John Stuart
1889 Hon. Arthur Gordon
1896 Peter Hay Hunter
1908 George Christie
1937 William Erskine Blackburn
1941 James Stuart Thomson
1948 Donald Davidson

Ministers of St George's Church

1814 Andrew Mitchell Thomson
1831 James Martin
1834 Robert Smith Candlish
1843 Robert Horne Stevenson
1880 Archibald Scott
1909 Gavin Lang Pagan
1918 Charles William Gray Taylor
1951 James Robert Thomson
1956 William Cecil Bigwood

Ministers of St Andrew's & St George's

1962 William Cecil Bigwood
1972 William Andrew Wylie
1986 Andrew R.C. McLellan
2003 Roderick D.M. Campbell

Ministers of Free St George's (later United Free)/St George's West
1843 Robert Smith Candlish
1861 James Oswald Dykes
1870 Alexander Whyte, until 1916
1896 Hugh Black
1907 John Kelman
1921 James Macdougall Black
1949 Murdo Ewen Macdonald
1965 William David Ranald Cattanach
1985 Robert Glover
1998 Peter McDonald

Ministers of St Andrew's & St George's West

2011 Ian Y. Gilmour (to 2018)
2019 Dr Rosie Magee (to 2022)

Edinburgh City Centre Churches Together

St Andrew's & St George's West is one of three churches which form Together, an ecumenical grouping in the New Town of Edinburgh. The others are St John's and St Cuthbert's.

See also

 List of Church of Scotland parishes
 List of listed buildings in Edinburgh

References

External links
 stagw.org.uk, the church's official website
 churchofscotland.org.uk, the Church of Scotland's official website
 BBC news article on refurbishment of bells
 Report in The Scotsman newspaper, 30 September 2008
 St Andrew's and St George's, Archiseek web site

1781 establishments in Scotland
Church of Scotland churches in Edinburgh
Category A listed buildings in Edinburgh
Listed churches in Edinburgh
New Town, Edinburgh
Churches completed in 1784
Religious organizations established in 1781
18th-century churches in the United Kingdom